Parlan Semple (January 9, 1832 – June 27, 1922) was a member of the Wisconsin State Assembly.

Biography
Semple was born on January 9, 1832, in Quebec. After his father's death, he lived with his mother and brother in Lowell, Massachusetts. In 1855, he married Louisa Hammond. They later moved to Shawano County, Wisconsin. After Louisa's death, he married Julia Emma Scott on his 54th birthday. They had one son. Semple died on June 27, 1922, in a nursing home in Green Bay, Wisconsin.

Career
Semple was a member of the Assembly from 1869 to 1871. He was a Republican.

References

Pre-Confederation Quebec people
Politicians from Lowell, Massachusetts
People from Shawano County, Wisconsin
Politicians from Green Bay, Wisconsin
Republican Party members of the Wisconsin State Assembly
1832 births
1922 deaths